United Carbon Building, also known as Boulevard Tower, Stanley Building, and Nelson Building, is a historic office building located at Charleston, West Virginia. It is a 12-story, steel-framed building sheathed in a smooth, unornamented shell of gold-colored brick, black steel and glass. Its slender volume rises 157 feet from the sidewalk to the twelfth-floor penthouse, which once served as the office of the building's prominent patron, Oscar Nelson (1879-1953). Mr. Nelson, president
of the United Carbon Company, commissioned architect Walter F. Martens to design the structure. The building was commissioned in 1939 as the national headquarters for the United Carbon Company, which occupied
the ninth through the twelfth floors until 1950.

It was listed on the National Register of Historic Places in 1994.

Its current list of tenants includes the West Virginia Higher Education Policy Commission and the West Virginia Community and Technical College System.

Gallery

References

Office buildings completed in 1940
Buildings and structures in Charleston, West Virginia
International style architecture in West Virginia
National Register of Historic Places in Charleston, West Virginia
Office buildings on the National Register of Historic Places in West Virginia
1940s architecture in the United States
Streamline Moderne architecture in West Virginia